Henry Jermyn may refer to:

 Henry Jermyn, 1st Earl of St Albans KG (c. 1604–1684), third son of Sir Thomas Jermyn and first Baron Jermyn of St Edmundsbury, Governor of Jersey
 Henry Jermyn, 1st Baron Dover (c. 1636–1708), nephew of the former, second son of (a later) Sir Thomas Jermyn and third and last Baron Jermyn of St Edmundsbury